King Street station may refer to:

King Street Station, a railway station in Seattle, Washington, United States
King Street–Old Town station, formerly King Street station pre-2012, a Washington Metro station in Alexandria, Virginia, United States
San Francisco 4th and King Street Station, a multi-modal station in San Francisco, California, United States
Oldham King Street tram stop, a light-rail stop in Oldham, England, United Kingdom
King station (Toronto), a subway station on King Street in Toronto, Ontario, Canada
King Drive station, an 'L' station in Chicago, Illinois, United States

See also
King station (disambiguation)
King Street (disambiguation)